IREL (India) Limited (Formally Indian Rare Earths Limited) is a government-owned corporation Mini-Ratna Category A, Schedule B Company, in India based in Mumbai, Maharashtra. It was incorporated as a public limited company in 1950, jointly owned by the Government of India and Government of Travancore, Kochi with the primary intention of taking up commercial scale processing of Monazite. Government of India took control of IREL in 1963 under the administrative control of Department of Atomic Energy (DAE). It was incorporated with the primary intention of taking up commercial scale processing of monazite sand at its first unit namely Rare Earths Division (RED), Aluva, Kochi for the recovery of thorium.

IREL commissioned its largest division called Orissa Sand Complex (OSCOM) at Chhatrapur, Odisha. Today IREL operates these four units along with a corporate office in Mumbai and a unit located in Manavalakurichi of Kanyakumari district. It produces/sells six heavy minerals namely ilmenite, rutile, zircon, monazite, sillimanite, and garnet as well as various value added products. From 1 May 2015 it started commercial operation of Monazite Processing Plant at Orissa to process 10000tpa monazite to produce 11220tpa of rare earth chloride, 13500 tri-sodium phosphate, 26tpa NGADU etc. Similarly High Pure Rare Earth facility also commenced operation to refine pure rare earth compounds.

The Corporate Research Centre is located at Kollam, Kerala and carries out research in the field of value added products from beach sand minerals, undertakes consultancy projects on mineral separation and flow sheet development, carrying out mineral analysis and caters to the needs of internal and external customers.

References

External links
 IREL(INDIA) LIMITED LOGO

Rare earth companies
Mining companies of India
Government-owned companies of India
Companies based in Mumbai
Non-renewable resource companies established in 1950
Indian companies established in 1950
Metal companies of India
1950 establishments in Bombay State